Ali Saeed Saqer (Arabic:علي سعيد صقر) (born 30 June 1989) is an Emirati footballer. He currently plays as a goalkeeper for Dibba Al Fujairah.

In September 2016 Ali Saeed Saqer received negative attention after he was issued a straight red card for stomping on Danilo Moreno Asprilla's head while he lay on the ground, in a 5-2 loss to Al-Ain.

External links

References

Emirati footballers
1989 births
Living people
Ras Al Khaimah Club players
Emirates Club players
Dibba FC players
Place of birth missing (living people)
UAE First Division League players
UAE Pro League players
Association football goalkeepers